Jamuniya is a village development committee in Nawalpur District in the Lumbini Zone of southern Nepal. At the time of the 1991 Nepal census it had a population of 6605 people living in 1004 individual households.

References

Populated places in Parasi District